"The Decembrist" is the eighth episode of the second season of the television series The Blacklist, aired on NBC on November 10, 2014. The episode was directed by Michael Watkins, and written by Jon Bokenkamp and John Eisendrath. This episode serves as the season's fall finale; the show returned on February 1, 2015 after the 49th Super Bowl.

The Blacklist number for this episode is No. 12.

In this episode, Raymond "Red" Reddington (James Spader) reveals the whereabouts of his rival Berlin's (Peter Stormare) long-lost daughter, and attempts to hunt down the person responsible for his belief she was dead. Federal agent Keen (Megan Boone) ponders murdering her ex-husband Tom Keen (Ryan Eggold) after chaining him in a secret hole for months.

Upon airing, the episode was watched by 9.75 million viewers, and attained an 18-49 rating of 2.5, placing first in its time slot and second for the night, behind only its lead-in show The Voice.

Plot
Federal agent Keen (Megan Boone) shoots her husband Tom Keen (Ryan Eggold). She orders Raymond "Red" Reddington (James Spader) to leave so she can completely murder him; instead, she chains him in a hole, and he reveals details regarding ex-KGB Berlin (Peter Stormare) and several other people on Red's Blacklist. A side-line reveals Federal agent Keen chained Tom in a hole for months.

Returning to the main story, Red meets with Berlin, then reveals his daughter Zoe (Scottie Thompson) is alive, and he presents her to him, thus making their feud pointless because Berlin believed Red killed her. Red asks Berlin 'who told you the lie?'; he reveals the person's identity as The Decembrist. Red and Berlin join to interview several people to discuss The Decembrist's identity. They realize it is long-time government agent, the evil manipulative Fitch (Alan Alda). Because his problem was believing him, ex-KGB Berlin decides to kill Fitch.

In another side-line, Red reveals to Federal agent Keen he is working with Berlin and he knows she keeps Tom chained in a hole. This infuriates her because her next promotion depends on arresting Berlin; Red expresses disappointment Elizabeth did not trust him. While chained, Tom tells Elizabeth she will not kill him despite her supposed desire. An innocent security-guard routinely checks the boat, so Federal agent Keen adds him to the growing list of people she is illegally imprisoning. While Federal agent Keen observes, Tom kills the guard; her associate holds her. Elizabeth orders Tom to snitch on the location of Berlin; Tom says if she releases him, he will be her snitch. Elizabeth asks for Federal agent Ressler's (Diego Klattenhoff) assistance. The two Federal agents free him after he snitches on Berlin. Federal agent Ressler threatens Tom some more.

Berlin takes Zoe to lunch. Zoe pretends to be uncomfortable with Berlin's security. To appease her, Berlin orders his men away. Red instantly steps-in to demand to know what Berlin's men did to the missing Fitch, Berlin realizes his daughter betrayed him. Federal agents find Fitch with a neck-bomb around his neck. He and his neck are imprisoned at FBI headquarters in the neck-bomb resistant box Red was in during the first episode. There, in the middle of the Hoover Building, EOD fumble around trying to disable the neck-bomb. Suddenly, announcing a complete reversal to his decades of government lying and manipulation, Fitch proclaims he does not want any more blood on his hands, and orders the EOD to leave. Fitch knows the neck-bomb is going to explode, so he asks to speak with Red. Red stands outside the box, and Fitch asks if he has "The Fulcrum"; Red claims he cannot stop the bomb. Fitch says his death will decrease resistance extremists, then calmly predicts, by 2017, conditions will worsen. Fitch tells Red the combination to a St. Petersburg safe, but his neck explodes before he can tell him the location.

Red and Berlin drink together while Berlin reminisces about better times during the Cold War. Finished, Red murders him. Federal agent Keen visits the boat ; Red reiterates his frustration about her distrusting him. Elizabeth reiterates her frustration she was unable to murder Tom, and Red offers his philosophy: "Love is still a factor and a power you cannot control".  They hug.

Red hands an envelope to Tom, ordering him twice "You are never to see her again. You are never to see her again". Tom tells Red he never snitched him out to Federal agents.

Reception

Ratings
The episode was watched by 9.75 million American viewers, and attained an 18-49 rating/share of 2.5/8. This marks an increase in viewership and 18-49 ratings from the previous episode, which was watched by 9.30 million viewers and attained an 18-49 rating/share of 2.4/7. However, this also marks a significant decrease in viewership and ratings from the first season's fall finale, which brought in 11.67 million viewers and an 18-49 rating/share of 3.2/9. The show placed first in its timeslot, and second for the night, behind only its lead-in show The Voice.

Including DVR viewing, the episode was watched by a total of 15.96 million viewers, and attained an 18-49 rating of 4.5. The Canadian broadcast received 1.99 million viewers, making it the third most-watched telecast of the night and the twelfth of the week.

Critical reception
Commentators gave the episode highly positive reviews, saying that the episode lived up to its anticipation. Jodi Walker of Entertainment Weekly gave the episode a highly positive review, commenting mainly on the episode's anticipation paying off: "Does The Blacklist still have it? This season's self-proclaimed "huge reveals" have all been largely foreshadowed in previews and Voice commercial breaks: Tom behind the door, Zoe as Berlin's daughter, Fitch as Berlin and Red's common enemy. But, The Blacklist stuck the landing where it counted tonight, when we finally got to see what all of those reveals mean to the world of Red and Lizzie. After the plethora of reveals in the last 10 minutes - or as NBC marketing would say, "You won't believe the. LAST. TEN. MINUTES" - my jaw has resumed its formerly gaping position". Brent Furdyk of ET Canada said "the gripping thriller ended the first half of its second season in true over-the-top fashion with two major characters biting the dust".

Jim McMahon of IGN gave the episode a 7.2 out of 10, saying that the show's midseason finale "goes out with some potentially big plot developments and a small bang".

Sean McKenna of TV Fanatic gave the episode a 4.6 out of 5: "Perhaps it being a fall finale helped amp things up, but it was so satisfying to get the entire hour focused on the bigger story. This was the engaging episode that I'd been waiting to get again, and I'm so glad how it turned out".

Andrea Reiher of Zap2it gave the episode (and the first half of the season) a positive review: "The first season [...] sometimes suffered from putting too much emphasis on the case of the week, leaving the overarching mythology barely present or even nonexistent. But Season 2 has pulled off the masterful job of providing cases each week that are wrapped up within the hour while most weeks also connecting in some way to the larger picture. It has made the drama more serialized and it became apparent during the fall finale that the season is neatly divided into acts (probably three), the first of which has come to a close with some events that perfectly set up Act II".

References

External links
 

2014 American television episodes
The Blacklist (season 2) episodes